The 2020–21 season was the 144th season in existence of Crewe Alexandra, their 97th in the English Football League and the first season back in EFL League One following a four-season absence. Along with League One, the club also participated in the FA Cup, EFL Cup and EFL Trophy.

The season covers the period from 1 July 2020 to 30 June 2021.

Transfers

Transfers in

Loans in

Loans out

Transfers out

Pre-season

Competitions

EFL League One

League table

Results summary

Results by matchday

Matches

The 2020–21 season fixtures were released on 21 August.

FA Cup

The draw for the first round was made on Monday 26, October. The second round draw was revealed on Monday, 9 November by Danny Cowley.

EFL Cup

The first round draw was made on 18 August, live on Sky Sports, by Paul Merson.

EFL Trophy

The regional group stage draw was confirmed on 18 August. The second round draw was made by Matt Murray on 20 November, at St Andrew’s.

Statistics

Appearances

|-
|colspan=15|Players who left the club:

|}

Goals record

Disciplinary record

Notes

References

Crewe Alexandra
Crewe Alexandra F.C. seasons